Tin Tin Five was a South Korean dance-pop group formed in 1993. It consisted of five members: Pyo In-bong, Lee Woong-ho, Hong Rok-gi, Lee Dong-woo, and Kim Kyung-sik. All of whom are male comedians.

They debuted with their eponymous studio album in 1993. Before releasing their second studio album Here We Go in 1995, Hong was briefly replaced by musical actor Jung Sung-hwa and eventually Kim Hak-joon. The group then took five-year gaps between major projects: We Begin Again in 2000, Best of Best in 2005, and finally Five Men Five Stories in 2010.

Five Men, Five Stories' release was announced while taking into consideration that member Lee Dong-woo had been diagnosed of retinitis pigmentosa back in 2009. Notwithstanding the latter news despite still being out of respect for Lee, the "fifth full album"-slash-first EP was distributed on January 13. It featured contributions from actor Ahn Jae-wook, comedians Park Mi-sun and Song Eun-yi, and girl group f(x).

 until today, Tin Tin Five remains completely inactive, with SM Entertainment yet to issue any statement regarding the group's fate. In the meantime, the members have individually gone on to enjoy some success in variety television.

Discography

Studio albums

Extended plays

Notes

References 

South Korean comedians
1993 establishments in South Korea
Musical groups established in 1993
Musical groups disestablished in 2010
K-pop music groups
SM Entertainment artists
SM Town
South Korean dance music groups
South Korean pop music groups
Vocal quintets